Pueblo Viejo is a barrio in the municipality of Guaynabo, Puerto Rico. Its population in 2010 was 23,816.

History
In 1508, Juan Ponce de León founded the original Spanish settlement in Puerto Rico at Caparra (named after the province of Cáceres, Spain, the birthplace of then-governor of Spain's Caribbean territories Nicolás de Ovando), which today is known as Pueblo Viejo barrio.

Puerto Rico was ceded by Spain in the aftermath of the Spanish–American War under the terms of the Treaty of Paris of 1898 and became an unincorporated territory of the United States. In 1899, the United States Department of War conducted a census of Puerto Rico finding that the population of Pueblo Viejo barrio was 480.

Sectors
Barrios (which are roughly comparable to minor civil divisions) in turn are further subdivided into smaller local populated place areas/units called sectores (sectors in English). The types of sectores may vary, from normally sector to urbanización to reparto to barriada to residencial, among others.

The following sectors are in Pueblo Viejo barrio:

Gallery

See also

 List of communities in Puerto Rico
 List of barrios and sectors of Guaynabo, Puerto Rico
 Caparra Archaeological Site

References

Barrios of Guaynabo, Puerto Rico